Damakawa is a moribund Benue–Congo language of northwest Nigeria. The language has become extinct, there are no longer any speakers of the language, although the oldest people can remember a few words. Approximately 80 or so words and phrases were collected, with difficulty, in April 2008 (the language seems to have been unknown to linguists until then).

The Damakawa have shifted to the nearby larger language C'Lela, and it is likely that all, or almost all of them, also speak the lingua franca Hausa. The Hausa name for the ethnic group is also Damakawa.

Classification
Based on such a small amount of data of uncertain reliability, it is hard to classify Damakawa precisely. It is probably best placed in the Northwest Kainji branch of Benue–Congo. The words that have been collected show similarities with both C'Lela and Kambari languages, and it may be that the Kambari words are loans or mis-rememberings.

Alternative names
The nearby Cicipu speakers call the Damakawa language 'Tidama'un'. In the trade language Hausa the expected name for the language would be Damakanci, given the people are called Damakawa. However Damakawa seems to be preferred by the Damakawa themselves, as far as can be ascertained.

Geographic distribution
The Damakawa people probably number about 500-1000, and live in three or four villages near Maganda in Sakaba Local Government Area, Kebbi State.

References

External links
 ISO 639-3 Request for new language code

Languages of Nigeria
Northwest Kainji languages
Articles citing ISO change requests
Extinct languages of Africa
Languages extinct in the 20th century